The United States Navy had a sizable fleet of escort aircraft carriers during World War II and the era that followed. These ships were both quicker and cheaper to build than larger fleet carriers and were built in great numbers to serve as a stop-gap measure when fleet carriers were too few. However, they were usually too slow to keep up with naval task forces and would typically be assigned to amphibious operations, often seen in the Pacific War's island hopping campaign, or to convoy protection in the war in the Atlantic. 

To that end, many of these ships were transferred to the Royal Navy as part of the US-UK lend-lease program. Note that many of the lower-numbered carriers were transferred to the Royal Navy, where they received new names.  The new names are mentioned in each article individually. While some of these ships were kept for a time in reserve after the war, none survive today, as they have all since been sunk or retired and scrapped. The following are the classes and stand-alone ships of the US Navy's escort carriers;

See also
 List of aircraft carriers of the United States Navy
 List of aircraft carrier classes of the United States Navy
 List of US Navy ships sunk or damaged in action during World War II § Aircraft carrier, escort (CVE)
 List of aircraft carriers
 List of aircraft carriers in service
 Timeline for aircraft carrier service
 List of aircraft carriers by configuration
 List of sunken aircraft carriers
 List of amphibious warfare ships
 List of escort aircraft carriers of the Royal Navy
 List of seaplane carriers of the Royal Navy

Notes and references

 The Ships and Aircraft of the U.S. Fleet, by James C. Fahey, Associate, United States Naval Institute, 1945 (Victory Edition)

United States
Aircraft carrier
Escort aircraft carriers list